The Rural Municipality of Saltcoats No. 213 is a rural municipality (RM) in the Canadian province of Saskatchewan within Census Division No. 5 and  Division No. 1. It is located in the east-central portion of the province.

History 
The RM of Saltcoats No. 213 incorporated as a rural municipality on December 9, 1912.

Geography

Communities and localities 
The following urban municipalities are surrounded by the RM.

Towns
Bredenbury
Saltcoats

The RM also neighbours the Little Bone 74B First Nations Indian reserve.

Demographics 

Government 
The RM of Saltcoats No. 213 is governed by an elected municipal council and an appointed administrator that meets on the second Tuesday of every month. The reeve of the RM is Don Taylor while its administrator is Ronald Risling. The RM's office is located in Saltcoats.

References 

Saltcoats
 
Division No. 5, Saskatchewan